Lebanon Township is one of the twelve townships of Meigs County, Ohio, United States.  The 2000 census found 1,029 people in the township.

Geography
Located in the eastern part of the county along the Ohio River, it borders the following townships:
Olive Township - north
Letart Township - southwest
Sutton Township - west
Chester Township - northwest

Jackson County, West Virginia lies across the Ohio River to the east.

It is the second-farthest upstream of Meigs County's Ohio River townships.

No municipalities are located in Lebanon Township, although the unincorporated community of Portland is located on the township's eastern shoreline.

Name and history
It is the only Lebanon Township statewide.

Government
The township is governed by a three-member board of trustees, who are elected in November of odd-numbered years to a four-year term beginning on the following January 1. Two are elected in the year after the presidential election and one is elected in the year before it. There is also an elected township fiscal officer, who serves a four-year term beginning on April 1 of the year after the election, which is held in November of the year before the presidential election. Vacancies in the fiscal officership or on the board of trustees are filled by the remaining trustees.

References

External links
County website

Townships in Meigs County, Ohio
Townships in Ohio